Valmontia is a genus of mites in the family Acaridae.

Species
 Valmontia mira Oudemans, 1923

References

Acaridae